Charles Borremans (5 April 1769 – 17 July 1827), was a composer of operas, and a violinist and conductor at the Théâtre Royal de la Monnaie in Belgium from 1804 to 1825. The composer Charles-Louis-Joseph Hanssens succeeded him as conductor of this opera house.

Borremans was born and died in Brussels.  The Borremans family was related to the Artot family: his sister was married to Maurice Artot, father of the famous violinist Joseph-Alexander Artot.

A Quatuor for the pianoforte harpsichord or with accompaniment of bass and two violone in F, of which a part is missing, is mentioned as number 476 in the inventory of the archives of the House of Arenberg at Edingen.

References

Belgian classical violinists
Male classical violinists
Belgian conductors (music)
Belgian male musicians
Male conductors (music)
1769 births
1827 deaths